Smend is a surname. Notable people with the surname include:

 Günther Smend (1912–1944), Second World War German Army officer involved in the 20 July Plot to assassinate Adolf Hitler
 Julius Smend (1857–1930), German theologian, brother of Rudolf Smend
 Rudolf Smend (1851–1913), German theologian